Berry Henson (born July 4, 1979) is an American professional golfer.

Henson was born in Thousand Oaks, California. He played college golf at the University of San Diego. He turned professional in 2003.

Henson began playing on the Asian Tour in 2011 and won the ICTSI Philippine Open.

Professional wins (3)

Asian Tour wins (1)

Asian Development Tour wins (1)

Other wins (1)

References

External links

American male golfers
Asian Tour golfers
Golfers from California
San Diego Toreros men's golfers
People from Thousand Oaks, California
Sportspeople from Ventura County, California
1979 births
Living people